Machhrauli is situated in the Indian state of Haryana. Machhrauli become Block (District Subdivision) in June 2020.

Geography 
Machhrauli is about 15 km from the nearest town, Jhajjar. It is in Matenhail sub district. Nearby villages:

 Khudan
 Chandpur
 Samaspur Majra
 Asadpur Khera
 Amadalpur
 Surheti
 Kahari
 Bhatera
 Ghatoli

Demographics 
As of 2011 India census, Machhrauli, Jhajjar had a population of 4,453 in 796 households. Males (2,335) constituted 52.43% of the population and females (2,118) 47.56%. Machhrauli had an average literacy (3,048) rate of 68.44%, lower than the national average of 74%. 12.95% of the population is under 6 (577).Most of the population of the village is Hindu Ahir and widely spoken language is Haryanvi.

Education

The village has a government senior secondary school with almost 600 Students. The school has a playground and basketball court. The school is affiliated to Haryana Board of School Education Bhiwani. Students can complete their 12th grade level education in Science, Arts and Commerce.

District Institute of Education and Training was established on June 17, 2014. Its main course is JBT (Junior Basic Training), a diploma level course.

Transport
Machhrauli has a railway station on Rewari-Rohtak line. Trains for Rohtak and Rewari are available. This railway station was inaugurated by Deepnder singh hooda MP rohtak Constituency and Bhupinder singh hooda on January 8, 2013.

See also
In State of Haryana four similar Villages exist, including the village of Jhajjar District.
 In Haryana (State), Panipat (District), Samalkha(Sub District), Machhrouli (VILLAGE)
 In Haryana (State), Yamunanagar (District), Bilaspur (Sub District),	Machhrauli (VILLAGE)
 In Haryana (State), Kurukshetra (District), Thanesar (Sub District),	Machhrauli (VILLAGE)
 In Haryana (State), Jhajjar (District), Jhajjar (Sub District), Machhrauli (VILLAGE)

References 

Villages in Jhajjar district